Toranomon Station (虎ノ門駅) is a subway station on the Tokyo Metro Ginza Line. It is located between Toranomon in Minato Ward and Kasumigaseki in Chiyoda Ward.

Station layout

The station has two side platforms — one for each direction.

Gallery

History

The station opened on November 18, 1938, as the eastern terminus of the original section of the Tokyo Rapid Railway from Aoyama-Rokuchōme (now Omotesandō). It became a through station when the line was extended to Shimbashi on January 15, 1939.

The station facilities were inherited by Tokyo Metro after the privatization of the Teito Rapid Transit Authority (TRTA) in 2004.

Surrounding area

Kasumigaseki government buildings
Japan Post HQ
Willcom HQ
Japan Tobacco HQ
Embassy of the United States, Tokyo
Kasumigaseki Station
Uchisaiwaicho Station (Toei Mita Line)

References 

Railway stations in Japan opened in 1938
Railway stations in Tokyo
Tokyo Metro Ginza Line